The Americus and Atlantic Railroad was founded in 1917 and operated from Mata to Methvins, Georgia.  It provided only freight service through a connection with the Atlanta, Birmingham and Atlantic Railroad and was eventually abandoned in 1926.

References

American companies established in 1917
Defunct Georgia (U.S. state) railroads
Railway companies established in 1917